= Pecos Expedition =

The Pecos Expedition was an exploratory United States military event in Texas. It began April 16, 1859, and ended August 17, 1859.
